Samuel ben Solomon of Falaise was a French rabbi, a tosafist of the twelfth and thirteenth centuries. His French name was Sir Morel, by which he is often designated in rabbinical literature.

He was a pupil of Judah Sir Leon of Paris and of Isaac ben Abraham of Sens. In 1240 he took part in the renowned controversy instigated by the baptized Jew Nicholas Donin.

Samuel was the author of the following works:

Tosafot to several Talmudical treatises, among which those to the 'Abodah Zarah were published, together with the text, according to the redaction of his disciple Perez ben Elijah
A commentary, no longer in existence, on the laws concerning Passover composed in verse by Joseph Ṭob 'Elem, quoted by Isaac ben Moses of Vienna (Or Zarua, ii. 114)
Ritual decisions, frequently cited by Meir of Rothenburg, Mordechai ben Hillel, and other rabbinical authorities of that time.

References

Jacobs, Jews of Angevin England, pp. 53, 146, 421. 
 Its bibliography:
Loeb, in R. E. J. i. 248;
Gross, Gallia Judaica, pp. 478-479:
Berliner's Magazin, iv. 179-194;
Heinrich Grätz, Gesch. vii. 130;
Leopold Zunz, Z. G. p. 37;

13th-century French  rabbis
French Tosafists